Grenoble Foot 38, commonly referred to as simply Grenoble or GF38, is a women's football club based in Grenoble, France. The club was called Grenoble Foot Féminin until it was merged by the town's men's football club, Grenoble Foot 38, in 1997. In 2016, GF38 merged with neighboring , which put the club's team in the Division 2.

History 
Grenoble Foot Féminin reached the Division 1 Féminine for the first time in its history in 1981, after having spent several years in the regional divisions of the Ligue Rhône-Alpes. The club would then go back and forth between the Division 1 and Division 2 until 1992, when relegation from the Division 1 that year provoked a rapid fall to the regional divisions of the Ligue Rhône-Alpes.

In 1997, on political will, the masculin clubs of Olympique Grenoble Isère and Norcap Grenoble merged to create Grenoble Foot 38. At the same time, Grenoble Foot Féminin was integrated into the club.

In the 2015–16 season, the first team of Grenoble competed in the Division d'Honneur, the fourth level of women's football in France, while neighboring club Grenoble Métropole Claix FF was playing in the Division 2. After initial rumours in June 2016, the absorption process took place in less than one month. The French Football Federation ratified the merger, and the playing rights of GMC2F were subsequently handed over to GF38. Therefore, the players and coaches of GMC2F, supplemented by several signings, participated in the Division 2 under the colors of Grenoble Foot 38.

Players

Squad

Notable former players

 Nadjma Ali Nadjim
 Inès Boutaleb
 Maysa Jbarah
 Lina Khelif
 Pilar Khoury
 Winie Mapangou

References

External links 

 Club website

 
Association football clubs established in 1997
1997 establishments in France
Sport in Grenoble
Women's football clubs in France
Football clubs in Auvergne-Rhône-Alpes